The China Women's National Wheelchair Basketball Team is the wheelchair basketball side that represents China in international competitions for women as part of the International Wheelchair Basketball Federation.

Competitions

Wheelchair Basketball World Championship

Summer Paralympics

References

National women's wheelchair basketball teams
Wheelchair basketball
National women's